Ricardo Bellver (Madrid, 23 February 1845 — Madrid, 20 December 1924) was a Spanish sculptor.

Biography 
Bellver studied at the Royal Academy of Fine Arts of San Fernando, and finished his sculptural education in Rome as a grant holder.

He became well known because of his sculpture The Fallen Angel (El Ángel Caído, 1877), a work inspired by a passage from John Milton's Paradise Lost, and which represents Lucifer falling from Heaven. The sculpture (see picture), of great dramatism and originality, was awarded the first place medal at the Spanish National Fine Arts Exhibition in 1878, and the same year it was cast in bronze for the third Paris World's Fair. Later on, the Prado Museum donated it to the City of Madrid, and in 1885 it was installed in a square with the same name in the Retiro Park (the largest one in Madrid). For that purpose, architect Francisco Jareño (1818–1892) designed a pedestal of granite, bronze and stone. The success of this work made Bellver been accepted as academician. He was director of the Arts and Works School in Madrid.

Other works of Bellver are in Saint Francis the Great Basilica, Saint Joseph Church, Pontifitial Church of Saint Michael, and Ministry of Public Works building in Madrid.

Works 
Santa Inés Burial (bas-relief).
The Fallen Angel, (El Ángel Caído), in Parque del Buen Retiro, Madrid.

Saint Agatha death, bas-relief (1888).
San Expedito carving (1916), in San Vicente Martir de Abando Church (Bilbao).
Juan Sebastián Elcano Statue (1888) in Mayor Hall Square in Guetaria (Guipúzcoa).
Neogotical doors of Sevilla cathedral.
Luis de la Lastra y Cuesta, Seville Cathedral, Capilla del Cristo de Maracaibo (1880).
Saint Bartolomew and Saint Andrew, in Saint Francis the Great Basilica, Madrid.
Monument to Donoso Cortés, San Isidro graveyard, Madrid.
Cardinal Siliceo sepulchre.

Notes

External links

People from Madrid
1845 births
1924 deaths
20th-century Spanish sculptors
20th-century Spanish male artists
19th-century Spanish sculptors
19th-century Spanish male artists
Spanish male sculptors